Bakwa-Kalonji is a town with an estimated population of 58,092 located in Kasai province of the Democratic Republic of the Congo. The elevation of the town is estimated to be 462 meters above sea level.

References

Populated places in Kasaï Province